Pherallodus is an Indo-Pacific genus of clingfishes from the family Gobiesocidae.

Species
There are currently two recognized species in this genus:
 Pherallodus indicus (M. C. W. Weber, 1913)
 Pherallodus smithi Briggs, 1955 (Mini-clingfish)

References

Gobiesocidae